Karamanlı can refer to:

 Karamanlı, Burdur, Turkey
 Karamanlı, Çivril, Turkey
 Karamanli Turkish, a dialect of Turkish language

See also
 
 Karamanlis (disambiguation)